John Francis Druze (July 3, 1914 – December 27, 2005) was an American football player and coach.

Playing career

College

In 1936, Tim Cohane, Fordham University's publicist, discovered a newspaper clipping from 1930 paying tribute to Fordham's linemen by calling them the Seven Blocks of Granite. Cohane revived the nickname for the Rams' 1936 and 1937 lines, and it was this second version that gained the greatest renown.

Druze, who was known as "Tarzan", was the right end. He was captain of the 1937 team and was also its placekicker.

The 1936 Rams finished 5–1–2 and lost a possible Rose Bowl bid when they were upset by New York University at Yankee Stadium, 7–6, in the season's final game.

"That was always a blood game", Druze told Newsday in 1986, referring to the rivalry. "Forget about the records. It was like Purdue and Notre Dame."

Fordham's 1936 team shut out three opponents and gave up 33 points. The 1937 Rams were 7–0–1 and held five opponents scoreless.

Druze's was a Fordham teammate of Vince Lombardi, the Pro Football Hall of Fame coach of the Green Bay Packers, who played right guard. Alex Wojciechowicz, the All-American center and later a Hall of Fame player with the Detroit Lions and Philadelphia Eagles, was also on the Fordham line, as were right tackle Al Babartsky, who later shortened his name to Bart; left guard Nat Pierce; left tackle Ed Franco; and left end Leo Paquin.

Druze recalled a half-century later, "You hit the books, you're back on the field and you hit the books again."

NFL
Druze was an 11th round (93rd overall) of the 1938 NFL Draft by the Brooklyn Dodgers. He played only that following season in the National Football League.

Coaching career

Boston College

Druze became an assistant to Frank Leahy at Boston College in 1939. Leahy had coached the Seven Blocks of Granite as an aide to Fordham's head coach, Jim Crowley, one of Notre Dame's Four Horsemen.

Notre Dame

When Leahy became the Notre Dame head coach in 1941, Druze joined him as an assistant, and he became a mentor to Leon Hart, an end who won the 1949 Heisman Trophy.

Marquette
Druze was the 18th head football coach at Marquette University located in Milwaukee, Wisconsin.  He held that position for three seasons (1956–1958).  His coaching record at Marquette was 2 wins, 26 losses, and 1 tie.  Since Marquette has discontinued its football program, this ranks him 18th at Marquette in total wins and 18th at Marquette in winning percentage (.086).

Head coaching record

College

References

External links

1914 births
2005 deaths
American football ends
Brooklyn Dodgers (NFL) players
Boston College Eagles football coaches
Fordham Rams football players
Marquette Golden Avalanche football coaches
Notre Dame Fighting Irish football coaches
Players of American football from Newark, New Jersey